The Flamingo Club has been the name of several notable places of entertainment:

Flamingo Club (London) in the UK
Flamingo Las Vegas in Las Vegas, Nevada, USA
Flamingo Club (Michigan) in Idlewild, Michigan, USA